Briefings in Bioinformatics is a peer-reviewed scientific journal covering bioinformatics, including reviews of databases and analytical tools for genetics and molecular biology. It also publishes primary research papers on novel bioinformatic models and tools. It is published by Oxford University Press.
The EMBnet community was initially involved in the creation of the journal. BiB was also supported by an educational grant from EMBnet.

Abstracting and indexing 
The journal is abstracted and indexed in:

According to the Journal Citation Reports, the journal had a 2019 impact factor of 8.990, ranking it 2nd out of 59 journals in the category "Mathematical & Computational Biology" and 3rd out of 77 journals in the category "Biochemical Research Methods".

References

External links 
 

Bimonthly journals
Bioinformatics and computational biology journals
Oxford University Press academic journals
Publications established in 2000
English-language journals